Recklessness (also called unchariness) is disregard for or indifference to the dangers of a situation or for the consequences of one's actions, as in deciding to act without stopping to think beforehand. Aristotle considered such rashness as one end (excessive) of a continuum, with courage as the mean, cowardice as the deficit vice. Recklessness has been linked to antisocial personality disorder.

Origins

"Reck" is a regard or reckoning, particularly of a situation. A reckless individual would engage in an activity without concern for its after-effects. It can in certain cases be seen as heroic—for example, the soldier fearlessly charging into battle, with no care for his own safety, has a revered status and military rank among some. However, recklessness is more commonly regarded as a vice—this same soldier may be a liability to his own side, or get himself killed for no benefit – and may be the product of a death wish.

Motivation

The driving-force behind recklessness may be a need to test fate - an attempt to bolster a sense of omnipotence or of special privileges.

Or it may be due to a loss of the feeling of anxiety, to a denial of it, or to an attempt to overcompensate for it.

Similarly dare-devils may overcompensate for an inhibited aggressiveness, while narcissists may enjoy a feeling that nothing can happen to them, similar to what Aristotle termed the maniac.

Bravery

Recklessness is often contrasted from bravery. Although the two could sometimes be connected, the latter is usually applied to cases where a person displays a more reasonable reckoning of the inherent danger, rather than none at all.

See also

References

Personality